Khalil Kandi may refer to:
 Khalil Kandi, Parsabad